Ambedkarism is called as the teaching, ideology or philosophy of B.R. Ambedkar, an Indian econonist, polymath, barrister, social reformer, human-rights advocate, and the architect of Indian Constitution. Ambedkarism includes the principles of Navayana and liberty, equality and fraternity along with democratic socialism and constitutionalism. An Ambedkarite is one who follows the philosophy of Ambedkar.

Social philosophy
According to B. R. Ambedkar "Society is always composed of Classes". Their foundations could be different. A person in a society is always a member of a class, whether it is economic, intellectual, or social. This is a universal truth, and early Hindu culture could not have been an exception to this rule, and we know it wasn't. So, which class was the first to transform into a caste, because class and caste are, in a sense, next-door neighbours, separated only by a chasm. "A caste is a closed social group."

Showing a balanced approach, he was a critic of both Hindu and Muslim and writes - In a “communal malaise”, both groups Hindus and Muslims, ignore the urgent claims of social justice. His book Thoughts on Pakistan, contains critic of Muslim too and in his books - Riddles in Hinduism, Philosophy of Hinduism, Annihilation of Caste, Castes in India, Who Were the Shudras?, The Decline and Fall of Buddhism in India and Against the Madness of Manu he directly criticises the caste-ridden Hindu society.

Untouchables were forced to not wear good clothes but for Ambedkar, the suit was a strategy for political resistance, an assertion of power, a means to break the caste barrier in a society that is caste ridden.

Ambedkar proposed Separate Electorate for the untouchables to send their own representatives in assembly but it was opposed by Gandhi and resulted in his defeat after the Poona Pact but later he advocated for the establishment of Settlement Commission that would provide separate villages for the Scheduled Castes.

See also

 Organizations 
Buddhist Society of India
Ambedkar Makkal Iyakkam
The Casteless Collective
Viduthalai Chiruthaigal Katchi
Dalit Film and Cultural Festival
Dalit Panthers of India
Dalit Shoshit Samaj Sangharsh Samiti
Bhim Army
Bhim Sena
BAMCEF
Bahujan Samaj Students' Forum
Ambedkar Students' Association
Birsa Ambedkar Phule Students' Association

References

Sources
 

B. R. Ambedkar